Rallapalli may refer to:
 Rallipalli, a village in Kambadur mandal of Anantapur district, Andhra Pradesh, India
 Rallapalli Anantha Krishna Sharma (1893-1979), composer of Carnatic music, singer and writer
 Rallapalli (actor), Telugu film actor